The 2016–17 season was Nottingham Forest's 151st season in existence and 9th consecutive season in the Championship since promotion in 2007–08. In addition to the Championship, the club participated in the FA Cup and the newly rebranded EFL Cup. The season covers the period from 1 July 2016 to 30 June 2017.

On 18 May a change of ownership of Nottingham Forest Football Club from Fawaz Al-Hasawi to a Greek consortium, led by Olympiacos owner and shipping magnate Evangelos Marinakis, was completed as Fawaz Al-Hasawi sold 100% of his stake in the club for an undisclosed sum. Marinakis completed the deal in partnership with Sokratis Kominakis, and the duo immediately announced the appointments of leading sports lawyer Nicholas Randall QC as Chairman, Olympiacos' Managing Director Loannis Vrentzos as CEO, and David Cook, formerly of Celtic and Everton, as Chief Commercial Officer.

First team squad

New contracts

Player transfers

Transfers in

Loans in

Transfers out

Loans out

Pre-season friendlies

Competitions

Championship

League table

Result summary

Results by matchday

Matches

FA Cup 

Forest entered the 2016–17 FA Cup at the third round, and were drawn to play Wigan Athletic at the DW Stadium on 7 January 2017.

EFL Cup 

On Wednesday 22 June 2016, The Football League released the opening fixtures list for the 2016–17 EFL Cup. Forest opened their campaign away at League Two side Doncaster Rovers.

Season statistics

Appearances and goals

|}

Goal scorers

Disciplinary record

References

Nottingham Forest
Nottingham Forest F.C. seasons